Arthur Willis Jones III (born June 3, 1986) is a former American football defensive end who played eight seasons in the National Football League (NFL). He played college football at Syracuse. He was drafted by the Baltimore Ravens in the fifth round of the 2010 NFL Draft and won Super Bowl XLVII with them. Jones has also played for the Indianapolis Colts and Washington Redskins. He is also the older brother of UFC Heavyweight Champion Jon Jones, and Super Bowl winner, defensive end Chandler Jones of the Las Vegas Raiders.

Early years
Jones was born in Rochester, New York to parents Arthur Jr. and Camille Jones. After moving to Endicott, Jones attended Union–Endicott High School. At Union–Endicott he played both football and wrestled. He was a two time NY state champ in wrestling. As a senior, he had 64 tackles, six sacks, and one fumble recovery to help lead Union–Endicott to a Section IV championship. Following that championship season, Jones was ranked as the 18th best prospect in New York by SuperPrep.

Considered only a two-star recruit by Rivals.com, Jones was not ranked among the nation's best defensive tackle prospects. He chose Syracuse over Pittsburgh and Rutgers.

College career
In 2005, as a true freshman, Jones was redshirted.

In a 34–14 win over Miami (Ohio), Jones sacked their quarterback, Daniel Raudabaugh, for a loss of seven yards. On November 11, 2006, in a game at Raymond James Stadium home of the South Florida Bulls, Jones recovered the first fumble of his collegiate career. In the same game he recorded a career-high five tackles. After playing in every game, Jones had 15 tackles (including sacks) and one fumble recovery.

Against Illinois, after Jones made a tackle on third down, Post-Standard blogger and local radio host Brent Axe wrote, "Arthur Jones is having the game of his life right now." As of October 21, 2007, Jones had five tackles for a loss. As of November 2, Jones had 14.5 tackles after the ball carrier crossed the line of scrimmage. In the beginning of the second half against South Florida on November 11, Jones injured his ankle on a chop block. On November 17, Jones was held out of the game against Connecticut and according to coach Greg Robinson the decision came because, "Arthur has been too good of a football player for us to risk putting him out there and really getting him hurt." For the season, he played in every game but the Connecticut game and was named Second-team All-Big East. His season high in tackles came against Iowa when he had nine.

On September 10, 2008, against Penn State, Jones had one sack and three tackles for a loss. After one month, Jones had four sacks to be one of the leaders for the Orange. After the 2008 season, Jones was named to the First-team All-Big East Conference and was an All-America candidate. Jones was one of only 10 players on the team to start every game. His season high in tackles came against Rutgers when he had eight. Following Syracuse's upset win over Notre Dame he was named Big East Defensive Player of the Week and was also awarded an ESPN Helmet Sticker for his performance. He ranks sixth on the Orange career record list for tackles for loss.

In 2009, Jones missed three games, playing in nine and made 19 tackles (7 for losses) and 1.5 sacks and recovered 2 fumbles and was named First-team All-Big East for the second consecutive season.

Professional career

Pre-draft

He was considered as one of the top senior defensive tackles for the 2010 NFL Draft.

Baltimore Ravens
Jones was drafted by the Baltimore Ravens in the fifth round (157th overall) in the 2010 NFL Draft. He was signed to a three-year deal on June 21, 2010. During his rookie season in 2010, Jones played 2 games without recording a single stat.

Jones saw an increased role in the 2011 season by playing 14 games with one start, making 20 tackles.

During the 2012 season, Jones had 4.5 sacks in the regular season. The Ravens advanced to Super Bowl XLVII for the second time in franchise history against the San Francisco 49ers. In that game, Jones registered a fumble recovery as well as a key sack on 49ers Quarterback Colin Kaepernick. The Ravens ended up winning the game 34–31, earning Jones his first Super Bowl Ring.

In 2013, Jones played 14 games (started 13) with 4 sacks on 53 tackles.

Indianapolis Colts

On March 11, 2014, Jones signed a 5-year contract with the Indianapolis Colts, worth more than $30 million. During his first season with the Colts in 2014, Jones played 9 games (started 3) with 1.5 sacks and a forced fumble on 34 tackles.

On September 5, 2015, Jones was placed on injured reserve for an ankle injury.

Jones was suspended the first four games of the 2016 season for violating the league's policy on performance-enhancing drugs. After returning from his suspension, Jones started all eight games he appeared in and tallied 30 tackles before being placed on injured reserve on December 19, 2016, with a groin injury.

On March 24, 2017, Jones was released by the Colts.

Washington Redskins
On November 1, 2017, Jones signed with the Washington Redskins. He was placed on injured reserve on November 11, 2017, with a dislocated shoulder.

Retirement
After the 2017 season ended, Jones announced his retirement via Instagram.

Personal life
Jones earned his degree in communication and rhetorical studies. His brother is mixed martial artist Jon Jones, who is the current UFC Heavyweight Champion, who is considered by many to be one of the best mixed martial artists of all time. His youngest brother, Chandler, is an edge rusher for the Las Vegas Raiders who previously played for the Arizona Cardinals and New England Patriots. Their teams played one another for the first time when the Ravens played the Patriots in Week 3 of the 2012 NFL season in a controversial win for Arthur and the Ravens, and again in the 2012 AFC Championship Game, also won by Arthur and the Ravens.

References

External links

 
 Indianapolis Colts bio
 Syracuse Orange bio

1986 births
Living people
Players of American football from New York (state)
Sportspeople from Rochester, New York
American football defensive ends
American football defensive tackles
Syracuse Orange football players
Baltimore Ravens players
Indianapolis Colts players
Washington Redskins players